Marina Lubian (born 11 April 2000) is an Italian volleyball player for the Italian national team.

Career 
She participated at the 2015 FIVB Volleyball Girls' U18 World Championship 
2017 FIVB Volleyball Girls' U18 World Championship,
2017 FIVB Volleyball Women's U20 World Championship,
2018 Montreux Volley Masters,  
and 2018 FIVB Volleyball Women's Nations League.

References

External links 

 FIVB profile
 https://www.youtube.com/watch?v=lIQ97EaET5I

2000 births
Living people
Italian women's volleyball players